The Subservient Chicken is an advertising program created to promote international fast food restaurant chain Burger King's TenderCrisp chicken sandwich and their "Have it Your Way" campaign. Created for the Miami-based advertising firm Crispin Porter + Bogusky (CP+B) by The Barbarian Group, the program featured a viral marketing website, television and print campaigns and a one-time pay-per-view program. The program was similar to other marketing campaigns created by CP+B for Burger King, including the Coq Roq, Ugoff, and Sith Sense.

History
The TenderCrisp sandwich was first advertised using the Subservient Chicken character  in a commercial called the Subservient Chicken Vest. The commercial was the first in a series of ads for the sandwich utilizing a line of viral marketing promotions by Crispin Porter + Bogusky for Burger King. In the ad, a man is sitting in his living room directing a person in a chicken suit to behave in any way he wants. The tag line was "Chicken the way you like it." According to Jeff Benjamin, an Executive Creative Director at CP+B, the campaign evolved from a television idea into an interactive one. After the success of the Subservient Chicken, Burger King used the character in several subsequent advertising campaigns.

Other advertising programs

Fantasy Ranch
The TenderCrisp Bacon Cheddar Ranch sandwich was promoted in the United States by a 2005 television advertising campaign directed by David LaChapelle and featuring recording artist Darius Rucker (of Hootie and the Blowfish) singing a country-style jingle to the tune of "Big Rock Candy Mountain." The ad also starred television presenter Brooke Burke, model Vida Guerra, and members of the Dallas Cowboys Cheerleaders.
ChickenFight.com
With the introduction of the Spicy TenderCrisp Sandwich, CP+B created the Chicken Fight ad program. The ads featured a forthcoming boxing match billed as The two "cockfighting chickens" between two people in chicken suits, one as "TC" and the other as "Spicy", a second chicken with orange "plumage". The actual "fight" was broadcast as one time short on DirecTV.
Big Buckin' Chicken/Big Huckin' Chicken
In March 2006, Big Buckin' Chicken commercial for Tendercrisp Cheesy Bacon Chicken Sandwich featured the Subservient Chicken again. The TV ad showed 8 mm-style footage of a cowboy riding the chicken in a rodeo while people on the sideline cheer on. An accompanying jingle states, "Big buckin' chicken/you are big, you are chicken." The voice over concludes that "the only way to beat it, is to eat it." The character was reused in another TenderCrisp ad riding a dirt bike, titled Big Huckin' Chicken.
Chicken BIG KING
In April 2014, Burger King celebrated the 10th anniversary of the Subservient Chicken in promotion of the Chicken BIG KING Sandwich. Subservient Chicken celebrated his anniversary in a short film where he trained for his return to fame after his fall into irrelevancy over the years.

Internet
In addition to the commercials, there was "The Subservient Chicken" web page. On the page, a man in a chicken costume performed a wide range of actions based on a user's input, showing pre-recorded footage and appearing like an interactive webcam. The site takes literally the advertising slogan "Get chicken just the way you like it". The site launched on April 8, 2004. The site was created for CP+B and BK by The Barbarian Group and is hosted at GSI in Kansas City, Missouri.
"The guy in the suit was originally an actor, but he was claustrophobic in the suit, so he wouldn't do it. And we had to use one of the costume's designers... He would do about six moves and then we would have to fan him off because he would get so hot in the costume," says CP+B ECD Jeff Benjamin.

There are more than three hundred commands that the Subservient Chicken responded to, including:

 moonwalk
 Throw pillow
 Riverdance or Irish dance
 The "elephant"
 Tango
 Show teeth
 Be an airplane
 Shake your booty
 The Robot
 Lay egg
 Walk Like an Egyptian
 Yoga
 Sleep
 Rage
 Raise the roof
 Fall
 Can I eat you?
 Squat
 Peck Ground
 Travolta
 Fight
 Roshambo
 Read a book from his bookcase.
 Have a drink of water
 Blow your nose
 Barrel roll
 Begone or go away
 Jump rope
 Hide behind sofa
 Golf swing
 Try to do a headstand
 Hide
 Leave
 Sit
 Watch TV
 Pick your nose & eat it
 Spin
 Do the YMCA
 Fly
 Handstand
 Hula hoop
 Cartwheel
 Push-up
 Electric Slide
 Air Guitar
 Tap Dance
 Referee
 Bowl
 Poke your eye out
 Three-point stance
 Paint
 Throw a Football
 Backflip
 Turn off the lights
 Sing
 Die
 Pee on the couch
 Pee in the corner
 Pee like a dog
 Do the splits
 headbang
 Pray
 Shakespeare
 Headbutt
 March like a German Soldier
 Swim
 Kick an imaginary soccer ball.
 Jump
 Act like a dog
 Puke
 Fart
 Hug
 Cabbage Patch
 Tai Chi
 Hula
 Ballet
 Breakdance
 Make a sandwich
 Playboy
 Be a monkey
 Macarena
 Kiss
 Go to sleep
 Flap around
 Be a duck
 Do the silly walk
 Rock, Paper, Scissors
 touch toes
 hop in one toe

See also
 Burger King advertising
 Burger King products

References

External links
 The Subservient Chicken

2012 disestablishments in the United States
2014 introductions
Burger King characters
Burger King advertising
Internet memes
Fictional chickens
Female characters in advertising